The 2015 season for  began in January at the Trofeo Santanyi-Ses Salines-Campos. Team Roompot is a Dutch-registered UCI Professional Continental cycling team that participated in road bicycle racing events on the UCI Continental Circuits and when selected as a wildcard to UCI ProTour events.

Team Roompot's beginnings came in the spring of 2014, when Erik Breukink, who was formerly the manager of the Dutch team , announced that he was seeking to create a new Dutch squad to ride at the UCI Professional Continental level. There were Dutch teams riding at UCI World Tour and UCI Continental levels, but none in the middle tier of professional cycling. Breukink announced his hope that the team would support the development of young Dutch riders. Other people involved in the development of the team included Michael Boogerd, Jean-Paul van Poppel and Michael Zijlaard.

While the team was under development, it was known as Orange Cycling in reference to the national colour of the Netherlands. The team sought sponsorship from several companies, but most prominently from Roompot Vakanties. Another Dutch team, WorldTour team , were also seeking a new title sponsor and were seen as in direct competition with Orange Cycling for the Roompot sponsorship.

On 13 August 2014, it was announced that Roompot had decided to sponsor the Orange Cycling project, apparently in part because the intention only to sign Dutch riders matched Roompot's marketing strategy. The following day, the team announced its first rider, Johnny Hoogerland, who had previously ridden for another Dutch team, .

Roster 

Riders who joined the team for the 2015 season

Season victories

References

External links
 

2015 road cycling season by team